was a town located in Hikami District, Hyōgo Prefecture, Japan.

As of 2003, the town had an estimated population of 7,161 and a density of 71.71 persons per km2. The total area was 99.86 km2.

On November 1, 2004, Aogaki, along with the towns of Hikami, Ichijima, Kaibara, Kasuga and Sannan (all from Hikami District), was merged to create the city of Tamba and no longer exists as an independent municipality.

External links
 Official website of Aogaki in Japanese

Dissolved municipalities of Hyōgo Prefecture
Tamba, Hyōgo